Jiangqiao (Shanghainese: kaon1jiau1) is a town of Jiading District, Shanghai, located in the southeastern portion of the district immediately north of G2 Beijing–Shanghai Expressway and about  north of Shanghai Hongqiao International Airport. , it has 19 residential communities (居委会) and 16 villages under its administration. It is the site of the non-passenger Jiangqiaozhen Station (:zh:江桥镇站) on the Beijing–Shanghai Railway.

See also 
 List of township-level divisions of Shanghai

References 

Towns in Shanghai